Joan Standing (21 June 1903 – 3 February 1979) was an English actress best known for playing Nurse Briggs in the 1931 horror film Dracula. She appeared in more than 60 films between 1919 and 1940.

Partial filmography

 The Loves of Letty (1919) - Slavey
 The Branding Iron (1920) - Maude Upper
 Silk Hosiery (1920) - Sophia Black
 Lorna Doone (1922) - Gwenny Carfax (uncredited)
 Oliver Twist (1922) - Charlotte
 Hearts Aflame (1923) - Ginger
 The Cricket on the Hearth (1923) - Tillie Slowboy
 Pleasure Mad (1923) - Hulda
 A Noise in Newboro (1923) - Dorothy Mason
 Three Weeks (1924) - Isabella
 Women Who Give (1924) - Sophia Higginboottom
 Happiness (1924) - Jenny
 What Shall I Do? (1924) - Lizzie
 The Beauty Prize (1924) - Lydia Du Bois
 Empty Hearts (1924) - Hilda, the maid
 Greed (1924) - Selina
 The Dancers (1925) - Pringle
 Faint Perfume (1925) - The Hired Girl
 Love on the Rio Grande (1925)
 Ranger of the Big Pines (1925) - Minor Role (uncredited)
 With This Ring (1925) - Cecilie's maid
 Counsel for the Defense (1925) - Printer's Devil
 The Outsider (1926) - Pritchard
 The Skyrocket (1926) - Sharon's Secretary
 Memory Lane (1926) - Maid
 Sandy (1926) - Alice McNeil
 The Little Firebrand (1926) - Miss Smyth
 Lost at Sea (1926) - Olga
 The Campus Flirt (1926) - Harriet Porter
 The First Night (1927) - Mrs. Miller
 Ritzy (1927) - Mary
 The College Hero (1927) - Nellie Kelly
 Beau Sabreur (1928) - Maudie
 Riley of the Rainbow Division (1928) - Mabel
 Home, James (1928) - Iris Elliot
 The Kid's Clever (1929) - A Girl
 The Cohens and Kellys in Atlantic City (1929) - Minor Role (uncredited)
 My Lady's Past (1929) - Maid
 Fashions in Love (1929) - Miss Weller
 The Marriage Playground (1929) - Miss Scopey
 Street of Chance (1930) - Miss Abrams
 Hell's Angels (1930) - Roy's Dancing Partner (uncredited)
 For the Love o' Lil (1930) - Chambermaid
 Extravagance (1930) - Mary - Maid (uncredited)
 A Lady's Morals (1930) - Louise
 Ex-Flame (1930) - Kilmer
 Dracula (1931) - Nurse Briggs
 Never the Twain Shall Meet (1931) - Julia
 Young as You Feel (1931) - Lemuel's Secretary
 The Age for Love (1931) - Eleanor
 Possessed (1931) - Whitney's Secretary (uncredited)
 Emma (1932) - Employment Agency Clerk (uncredited)
 Broken Lullaby (1932) - Flower Shop Girl (uncredited)
 Love Affair (1932) - Jim's Secretary (uncredited)
 American Madness (1932) - Panicked Depositor (uncredited)
 Goldie Gets Along (1933) - The Mayor's Secretary (uncredited)
 Private Detective 62 (1933) - Client with Free (uncredited)
 Jane Eyre (1934) - Daisy
 Broadway Bill (1934) - Brooks' Phone Operator (uncredited)
 Behold My Wife! (1934) - Ms. Smith (uncredited)
 Straight from the Heart (1935) - Mother of Crippled Boy (uncredited)
 The Headline Woman (1935) - Sadie, Chase's Secretary (uncredited)
 Little Lord Fauntleroy (1936) - Dawson (uncredited)
 Grand Ole Opry (1940) - Woman (uncredited)
 Colorado (1940) - Saloon Reader (uncredited)
 Li'l Abner (1940) - Kitty Hoops

References

External links

1903 births
1979 deaths
English film actresses
English silent film actresses
British expatriate actresses in the United States
Actresses from Worcestershire
20th-century English actresses
Standing family